Richard David McCormick (born July 4, 1940) is an American business executive.

Biography
McCormick served as CEO of US West from 1990 to 1998.  He was also a director of Wells Fargo & Company (1983-2010) and an honorary chairman of the International Chamber of Commerce (ICC).

McCormick was born in Fort Dodge, Iowa, the son of Elmo Eugene McCormick and Virgilla (Lawler) McCormick. He received his BS degree in electrical engineering from Iowa State University in 1961.  During his time as an undergraduate he was a member of the Phi Gamma Delta fraternity.  Post graduation he went to work for AT&T as an engineer in Kansas City, Missouri.

On June 29, 1963, he married Mary Patricia Smola, and had four children.

He moved to Northwestern Bell in 1969, rising to the presidency of the Omaha-based company in 1982. A year after the divestiture of the Bell System, he went to Denver in 1985 as executive vice president of US West, Inc., the new regional Bell operating company.  McCormick was elected president and chief operating officer in 1986, chief executive officer in 1990, and chairman in 1992 (replacing Jack A. MacAllister in both instances).

In 1995 McCormick was named chairman of the United States Council for International Business, the US affiliate of the International Chamber of Commerce. He stepped down as chairman and was named vice chairman in February 2001. Elected chairman of the International Chamber of Commerce in 2001, he retired in 2003 and was given the emeritus title of honorary chairman.

Having been elected a director of Norwest Bank in 1983, upon the merger with Wells Fargo & Company in 1998 he became a director of Wells Fargo. McCormick retired as CEO of US West in 1998 and as chairman of the board of directors in 1999.  Solomon J. Trujillo replaced him as chairman. In January, 1999 McCormick was appointed vice president of International Chamber of Commerce (ICC) and in January, 2001 he became the president of the body.

In the past McCormick served on the boards of Nortel Networks Corporation, United Technologies Corporation, Health Trio, UAL Corporation, Wells Fargo & Company, and Unocal, and as a trustee for the Denver Art Museum.

Active in Republican politics, he has been a member of George W. Bush for President, Bush-Cheney 2004, John McCain 2008, and the Freedom and Free Enterprise Political Action Committee.

References

1940 births
Living people
People from Fort Dodge, Iowa
People from Denver
Wells Fargo
Iowa State University alumni
American telecommunications industry businesspeople
Colorado Republicans
Directors of Nortel
American corporate directors
American chief operating officers
American chief executives